Endoclita signifer is a species of moth of the family Hepialidae. It is found in eastern Asia, including Japan, Taiwan, Sylhet, Burma, Borneo and Java.

The larvae bore in Fraxinus species and Paulownia tomentosa. It takes two years to complete its life cycle with adults appearing in September.

References

Moths described in 1856
Hepialidae